The Burlington Sock Puppets are a summer collegiate baseball team of the Appalachian League. They are located in Burlington, North Carolina, and play their home games at Burlington Athletic Stadium.

History

Previous Burlington teams 
Professional baseball was first played in Burlington, North Carolina, from 1958 to 1964 by the Burlington Indians, who competed in the Carolina League (Class B through 1962; thereafter Class A) as a Cleveland Indians farm club. Twenty-two years later, Cleveland placed the Burlington Indians in the Appalachian League as a Rookie-level affiliate from 1986 to 2006. They were known as the Burlington Royals during an affiliation with the Kansas City Royals from 2007 to 2020.

Collegiate summer team 

In conjunction with a contraction of Minor League Baseball beginning with the 2021 season, the Appalachian League was reorganized as a collegiate summer baseball league, and the Burlington Royals were replaced by a new franchise in the revamped league designed for rising college freshmen and sophomores. The new team became known as the Burlington Sock Puppets. The nickname refers to Burlington's textile heritage.

References

External links 
 

2021 establishments in North Carolina
Amateur baseball teams in North Carolina
Appalachian League teams
Baseball teams established in 2021
Burlington, North Carolina